Velleral (2,2,8-trimethyl-3,3a,8,8a-tetrahydro-1H-azulene-5,6-dicarbaldehyde) is a sesquiterpene dialdehyde found in certain mushrooms, like Lactarius torminosus and Lactarius vellereus, after which it was named. The compound is thought to be part of a chemical defense system that protects the mushrooms against predation. First isolated in 1969, and characterized structurally in 1973, velleral has antimicrobial activity. Several syntheses have been devised.

References

Sesquiterpenes
Azulenes
Aldehydes